Sir Gerald Christopher Cash  (28 May 1918 – 6 January 2003) was the third governor-general of the Bahamas from 1979 to 1986.

Life 
Cash was born in Nassau and attended Eastern Senior High School and Government High School from which he graduated at 15. Cash was called to the Bahamas Bar in 1940 and to the English Bar at the Middle Temple in 1948.

In 1949, Cash was elected as an MP to the House of Assembly. Cash served as a member of the Executive Council from 1958 to 1962 and a Senator from 1969 to 1979. In 1964, Cash was made an Officer of the Most Excellent Order of the British Empire.

Cash served as Milo Butler's Deputy Governor General on 5 occasions from 1973 to 1976. Cash was appointed Acting Governor-General in 1976 and, in 1977, Cash was made a Knight Commander of the Royal Victorian Order (KCVO).

Cash was appointed Governor-General in 1979.

In 1980, Cash was made Knight Grand Cross of the Order of St Michael and St George (GCMG) and, in 1985, Cash was knighted Grand Cross of the Royal Victorian Order (GCVO).

Cash served as Governor-General until his retirement in 1986. Cash is the longest serving Governor General in the history of the Commonwealth of the Bahamas.

Sir Gerald Cash died in 2003 at the age of 85 from a stroke.  Cash and his wife, (the former) Dorothy Long, had two sons and one daughter.

References

1918 births
2003 deaths
Governors-General of the Bahamas
Members of the Senate of the Bahamas
Presidents of the Senate of the Bahamas
Officers of the Order of the British Empire
Knights Grand Cross of the Order of St Michael and St George
Knights Grand Cross of the Royal Victorian Order
People from Nassau, Bahamas